Suona (IPA: /swoʊˈnɑː/), also called dida (from Cantonese / [dīdá]), laba or haidi, is a traditional double-reeded Chinese musical instrument. The Suona's basic design originated in ancient Iran, then called "Surna". Suona appeared in China around the 3rd century. It had a distinctively loud and high-pitched sound, and was used frequently in Chinese traditional music ensembles, particularly in those that perform outdoors. It was an important instrument in the folk music of northern China, particularly in provinces of Shandong and Henan, where it has long been used for festival and military purposes. It is still being used, in combination with sheng mouth organs, gongs, drums, and sometimes other instruments in weddings and funeral processions. Such wind and percussion ensembles are called chuida or guchui (this name refers to the suona itself in Taiwanese Hokkien).  Stephen Jones has written extensively on its use in ritual music of Shanxi province. It was also common in the ritual music of Southeast China. In Taiwan, it was an essential element of ritual music that accompanied Daoist performances of both auspicious and inauspicious rites, i.e., those for both the living and the dead. One of the most famous piece that uses suona as the leading instrument is called "Bai Niao Chao Feng", or "Hundred Birds Worship the Phoenix". The movie Song of the Phoenix casts the rise and fall of the popularity of suona in modern Chinese musical history.

Construction
The suona as used in China had a conical wooden body, similar to that of the gyaling horn used by the Tibetan ethnic group, both of which used a metal, usually a tubular brass or copper bocal to which a small double reed was affixed, and possessed a detachable metal bell at its end. The double-reed gave the instrument a sound similar to that of the modern oboe. The traditional version had seven finger holes. The instrument was made in several sizes. The nazi, a related instrument that was most commonly used in northern China, consisted of a suona reed (with bocal) that was played melodically. The pitches were changed by the mouth and hands.video Sometimes the nazi was played into a large metal horn for additional volume.

Modern Construction 
Since the mid-20th century, "modernized" versions of the suona have been developed in China; incorporating mechanical keys similar to those of the European oboe, to allow for the playing of chromatic notes and equal tempered tuning (both of which were difficult to execute on the traditional suona). There is now a family of such instruments, including the zhongyin suona, cizhongyin suona, and diyin suona. These instruments are used in the woodwind sections of modern large Chinese traditional instrument orchestras in China, Taiwan, and Singapore, though most folk ensembles prefer to use the traditional version of the instrument.  It is used in modern music arrangements as well, including in the works of Chinese rock musician Cui Jian, featuring a modernized suona-play in his song "Nothing To My Name" (一无所有) played by the saxophonist Liu Yuan.

Ranges of the orchestral "suona":
Piccolo suona in G, F and E
Sopranino suona in D, C and Bb
Soprano suona in A and G
Alto suona in F
Tenor suona in C
Bass suona in various keys

The alto, tenor and bass varieties are normally keyed and the soprano varieties are sometimes keyed. The highest varieties are not normally keyed, but there are variants of them — usually in the key of C — that are keyed to assist in the playing of accidentals. The note played when the left hand's fingers and right index finger are covering the playing holes is considered the key of the instrument.

History

Origins
Although the origin of the suona in China is unclear, with some texts dating the use of the suona as far back as the Jin dynasty (266–420), there is a consensus that the suona originated outside of the domains of ancient Chinese kingdoms, possibly having been developed from Central Asian instruments such as the sorna, surnay, or zurna, from which its Chinese name may have been derived. Other sources state the origins of the suona were Arabia, or India. A musician playing an instrument very similar to a suona was shown on a drawing on a Silk Road religious monument in the western Xinjiang province. It dates to the 3rd or 5th centuries, and depictions dating to this period found in Shandong and other regions of northern China depicted it being played in military processions, sometimes on horseback. It was not mentioned in Chinese literature until the Ming Dynasty (1368–1644), but by this time, the suona was already established in northern China.

Other instruments related to the suona may have also descended from the Asian zurna, such as the European shawm. Other examples include the Korean taepyeongso, the Vietnamese kèn and the Japanese charumera. The latter's name is derived from charamela, the Portuguese word for shawm. Its sound was well known throughout Japan, as it is often used today by street vendors selling ramen.

Use outside China
The suona was used as a traditional instrument by Cubans in Oriente and Havana, having been introduced by Chinese immigrants during the colonial era. Known locally as corneta china, it has been one of the lead instruments in the conga carnival music of Santiago de Cuba since 1915. In Havana, the term "trompeta china" was sometimes used.

In America, the jazz saxophonist Dewey Redman often played the suona in his performances, calling it a "musette". English bassist and saxophonist Mick Karn used the instrument crediting it as a dida.

The same instrument, also called a "musette", was used in "Oriental Bands" of the Shriner fraternal organization. Dressed in "Arabic" garb with mallet drums, Oriental Bands marched in parades that featured "little cars" driven by members. They wore the Fez (hat). They arrested bystanders, gave them a whisky and let them go. The instrument was not known to be of Chinese origin, just "Oriental". Dewey Redmond possibly got his soprano suona as a former Shriner import. The Shriners even supplied the reeds (which are a constant issue because every reed is different).

Notable performers
Liu Qi-Chao
Liu Ying
Liu Yuan, saxophonist with Cui Jian's band, who trained on the suona at the Beijing Art School, and who used the instrument on Cui's 1994 album Hongqi xia de dan
Song Baocai
Wu Zhongxi
Zhou Dongchao
Jin Shiye
Guo Yazhi
Kot Kai-lik
Xia Boyan 
Law Hang-leung
Li Ching-fong
Liu Hai
Lee Yiu-cheung
Lin Ziyou
Tseng Chien-Yun

See also
Traditional Chinese musical instruments
Guan (instrument)
Lingm
Zurna
Piccolo oboe
Rhaita
Kangling
Sopila
Shehnai

References

Wang, Min (2001). The Musical and Cultural Meanings of Shandong Guchuiyue from the People's Republic of China.  Ph.D. dissertation.  Kent, Ohio:  Kent State University.
New Grove Dictionary of Music and Musicians, second edition, edited by Stanley Sadie and John Tyrrell (London, 2001).
Jones, Stephen (2007). Ritual and Music of North China: Shawm Bands in Shanxi Province. SOAS Musicology Series.  Burlington, Vermont: Ashgate Publishing.

External links
Suona website (Chinese)
 Suona and Bagpipe Duet - Unique Public Performance, Zhongzi Wu & Dave All, Vancouver, B.C., Oct.21, 2010.

Audio
http://music.cn.yahoo.com/search?pid=ysearch&source=ysearch_music_result_topsearch&p=%DF%EF%C4%C5&mimetype=all Click the image of the headphones to play a track.

Single oboes with conical bore
Chinese musical instruments